The  is an archaeological site with the ruins of a Jōmon period settlement, located in what is now part of the town of Minakami, Gunma Prefecture in the northern Kantō region of Japan. The site was designated a National Historic Site of Japan in 1944.

Overview
The Minakami site is located on a river terrace of a small tributary of the Tone River. It consists of the traces of two late Jōmon period dwellings with flagstone floors containing a stone-lined rectangular hearth in the center, separated by about 100 meters of swampy ground. The first was discovered in 1935 and the second in 1937. The flagstones were rounded river stones and the overall dimensions of the dwelling appear to have been two meters by four meters in a rough ellipse. Pot-shaped Jōmon pottery earthenware and various stone tools such as stone axes, arrowheads and stone plates were also excavated. 

The ruins are now covered with small sheds for preservation, and the remains can be seen though a small window. The site is located about 5 minutes by car from Minakami Station on the JR East Jōetsu Line.

See also

List of Historic Sites of Japan (Gunma)

References

External links
Minakami town home page 

Jōmon period
Minakami, Gunma
Historic Sites of Japan
Archaeological sites in Japan
History of Gunma Prefecture